Posht Sara (also Romanized as Posht Sarā and Posht Serā) is a village in Jirdeh Rural District, in the Central District of Shaft County, Gilan Province, Iran. At the 2006 census, its population was 411, in 103 families.

References 

Populated places in Shaft County